"Love Somebody" is a song by Rick Springfield. It was released in 1984 as the first single from his soundtrack album Hard to Hold.

Cash Box said that the song demonstrates Springfield's improvement as a songwriter since he began his pop music career.

The song peaked at No. 5 on the Billboard Hot 100.

Chart performance

Weekly charts

Year-end charts

References

1984 singles
1984 songs
Rick Springfield songs
Songs written by Rick Springfield
RCA Records singles